You Brought the Sunshine is the eighth album released by The Clark Sisters in 1981. In 1983, the album peaked at number three on the US Billboard Top Gospel Albums chart, before appearing on the 1983 and 1984 year-end charts.

The album contained the crossover hit single "You Brought the Sunshine (Into My Life)" which had sold over 200,000 units by November 2, 1985, after peaking at number 16 on US Billboard Hot R&B/Hip-Hop Songs and number 27 on Dance Club Songs in 1983. In 2020, the song reached number 2 on the Gospel Digital Sales chart. Also in 2020, a live recording of the song from the album Live – One Last Time (2007), peaked at number 11 on Hot Gospel Songs.
On his 2018 album Negro Swan, Blood Orange covered the song Center Thy Will as a duet with Ian Isiah. Beyoncé would also sample that same song on her 2022 album Renaissance in the song Church Girl.

Track listing
Credits adapted from the album's liner notes

Charts

Weekly charts

Year-end charts

References

The Clark Sisters albums
1980 albums